The 2020–21 European Rugby Challenge Cup is the seventh edition of the European Rugby Challenge Cup, an annual second-tier rugby union competition for professional clubs. Including the predecessor competition, the original European Challenge Cup, this was the 25th edition of European club rugby's second-tier competition. 

The tournament began in December 2020. The final, originally scheduled to be held at the  Stade Vélodrome in Marseille, took place on 21 May 2021 at Twickenham Stadium.

On 11 January 2021 EPCR announced the competition was suspended temporarily due to new restrictions surrounding the COVID-19 pandemic. A revised format to finish the tournament was announced on 24 February 2021.

Teams 
Fourteen teams will qualified for the 2020–21 European Challenge Cup from Premiership Rugby, the Pro14 and the Top 14, as a direct result of their domestic league performance having not qualified for the Heineken Champions Cup. Although, the two South African Pro14 teams are not eligible.

The distribution of teams was:

 England: four teams
 Any teams finishing between 9th and 11th position in the Premiership Rugby that do not qualify for the 2020–21 European Champions Cup
 The champion of the RFU Championship
 France: six teams
 Any teams finishing between 9th and 14th position in the Top 14 that do not qualify for the 2020–21 European Champions Cup
 Ireland, Italy, Scotland, Wales: four teams
 Four teams from the Pro14, excluding the South African teams, that do not qualify for the 2020–21 European Champions Cup

Team details
Below is the list of coaches, captain and stadiums with their method of qualification for each team.

Preliminary stage

Teams were placed into one of the two tiers, with the higher ranked clubs being put in Tier 1. The nature of the tier system meant that no draw was needed this year. Brackets show each team's ranking and their league. e.g. 9 Top 14 indicates the team was the ninth placed team from the Top 14.

The preliminary stage would consist of a single pool of 14 teams. No team would play a team in the same tier and no club would play another club from the same league. Each team was scheduled to play four matches with the top eight teams advancing to the knockout stage. The top eight teams were due to be joined in the round of 16 by the teams finishing between 5th and 8th in each pool of the 2020–21 European Rugby Champions Cup pool stage.

The revised format announced in February 2021 would see the top 8 teams after 2 pool games advance to the round of 16 along with the eight teams placed between 9th and 12th in each pool of the Champions Cup.

Last 16 rankings

Knockout stage
The knockout stage commenced with a round of 16 consisting of the top 8 ranked teams from the preliminary stage and the teams placed between 9th and 12th in each Champions Cup pool. Due to the truncation of the preliminary stage, a draw was used to determine matches in both round of 16 and quarter-finals but no team would face a team from the same league in the round of 16. Teams which won both their matches and were not awarded points due to COVID cancellations would be guaranteed home advantage. Therefore, Leicester Tigers, London Irish and Ospreys received home advantage.

The draw for the round of 16 and quarter-finals took place on 9 March 2021 in Lausanne, Switzerland.

Bracket

Round of 16
Fixtures were announced on 16 March 2021.

Quarter-finals

Semi-finals
The draw for the semi-finals took place on 11 April 2021 at BT Sport's studios in London.

Final

See also 
 2020–21 European Rugby Champions Cup

Notes

References 

 
European Rugby Challenge Cup
European Rugby Challenge Cup
European Rugby Challenge Cup
European Rugby Challenge Cup
European Rugby Challenge Cup
European Rugby Challenge Cup
European Rugby Challenge Cup
EPCR Challenge Cup seasons